The 1986 British League season was the 52nd season of the top tier of speedway in the United Kingdom and the 22nd known as the British League.

Summary
Oxford Cheetahs won the league for the second consecutive year and the treble by sharing both the Speedway Star Knockout Cup and League Cup with Cradley Heath Heathens. Despite the easy manner of their 1985 league success Oxford made critical changes which ensured domination for a second consecutive season. They were forced to make changes due to the averages points limit that applied to all teams. Hans Nielsen and Simon Wigg were retained, as were Andy Grahame and Marvyn Cox but Jens Ramussen was replaced with Per Sorensen and Nigel De'ath was brought in as full time reserve. Both Sorensen and De'ath maintained good form throughout the season and combined with the heavy scores of the heat leaders the team were able to win the league again. Cradley returned to form and provided Oxford with their main challenge, the rivalry between the Nielsen of Oxford and Erik Gundersen of Cradley was memorable. Nielsen also replaced Gundersen as the world champion by the end of the season and the pair were World Pairs and World Cup winners.

One of the Danish pairs main rivals was Englishman Kenny Carter, regarded as a potential world champion and who at the age of just 21 nearly won the 1982 world title. He was riding for Bradford Dukes and ten matches into the season, on the morning of 21 May the speedway world was subject to another shock. Following on from the Billy Sanders tragedy the season before Carter shot his wife dead and then killed himself.

Final table
M = Matches; W = Wins; D = Draws; L = Losses; Pts = Total Points

British League Knockout Cup
The 1986 Speedway Star British League Knockout Cup was the 48th edition of the Knockout Cup for tier one teams. Oxford Cheetahs and Cradley Heath Heathens were declared joint winners because the second leg of the final was not held and the first leg had ended 39-39.

First round

Quarter-finals

Semi-finals

Final
The title was shared after two failed attempts to hold the second leg due to rain.

First and only leg

League Cup
The League Cup was contested as a league format. The cup was shared following two failed attempts to stage the second leg of the final at Oxford due to rain. Oxford had won the first leg at Cradley Heath 40-38.

Qualifying table

Semi-finals

Final
First and only leg

Leading final averages

+rode 10 matches before his death

Riders & final averages
Belle Vue

 9.34
 7.37
 6.93
 6.48
	6.10
 5.43
 4.28
 2.67
 2.65
 1.60
 1.06

Bradford

 10.05
 9.32
 8.20
 7.26
 6.30
 6.01
 4.16
 3.88

Coventry

 9.68 
 8.74
 8.69
 6.41
 5.68
 5.60
 3.50
 1.71

Cradley Heath

 11.03
 8.58
 7.80 
 7.17
 6.08
 3.74
 3.23
 2.06

Ipswich

 10.38
 8.00
 7.79
 5.69
 4.90
 4.71
 4.57
 4.17
 3.79

King's Lynn

 9.06
 7.74
 6.73
 5.38
 4.91
 4.70
 4.60
 4.21
 4.15
 2.28
 1.11

Oxford

 11.57
 10.20
 8.11
 6.14
 6.05
 5.34
 4.33
 2.43

Reading

 9.34
 8.72
 7.90
 7.36
 5.89
 5.47
 5.33
 1.35
 1.27

Sheffield

 9.65 
 8.76 
 7.89
 7.53
 7.24
 5.83
 5.46
 4.62
 3.27

Swindon

 8.77
 8.45
 7.82
 6.79
 6.64
 6.07
 5.16
 4.58
 3.16

Wolverhampton

 9.72
 7.70 
 7.04
 6.18
 5.23
 2.97
 1.07

See also
List of United Kingdom Speedway League Champions
Knockout Cup (speedway)

References

British League
1986 in speedway
1986 in British motorsport